Tây Bồi, or Vietnamese Pidgin French, was a pidgin spoken by non-French-educated Vietnamese, typically those who worked as servants in French households or milieux during the colonial era. Literally, it means "French (Tây) [of- or spoken by] male servants (Bồi)". During the French colonization period, the majority of household servants for the French were male. The term is used by Vietnamese themselves to indicate that the spoken French language is poor, incorrect and ungrammatical.

 is the Vietnamese phonetic spelling of the French word "boy" (from the English word), which refers to male household servants (it also means "to add" as a verb, which incidentally refers to how this pidgin worked).

The French government/colonizers or protectors opened French public schools (from pre-kindergarten through the Baccalaureat II) staffed by all native French speakers to take care of their compatriots/expatriates' children's education. Vietnamese children were admitted as well if they could pass the entrance examination tailored to their age and grade level. The Vietnamese elite class spoke French, and those with French Baccalaureat diplomas could attend French universities in France and in its colonies. After France's withdrawal from Indochina in 1954, Tây Bồi ceased to be used as a common language as standard French was used and is believed to have become extinct around the 1980s. Today standard French continues to be taught at schools and universities in Vietnam as a second language.

Examples

(Bickerton 1995: 163)

See also
French Indochina
French language
Vietnamese language
Butler English, a similar phenomenon in colonized India

References

French-based pidgins and creoles
Languages of Vietnam
Extinct languages of Asia
Languages extinct in the 1980s
French language in Asia